Youngstown Executive Airport (FAA LID 06G) was a public airport in Mahoning County, Ohio, located 51 nautical miles southeast of Cleveland Hopkins International Airport.

History 
Opening at some point between 1960 and 1962, this airport was a multi-use public airport for charters, aircraft maintenance, flight instruction, and even regular drag racing in its later years (causing resentment by the local pilots). In the 1970s, the airport was a Cessna aircraft dealership.

Today, the airfield is used by the NightHawks RC Club. The NightHawks rent it from the Allison Brothers, who currently own the airfield. A 1,200-foot portion of the former runway has been repaved for RC aircraft usage.

Facilities and Aircraft 
The airport had two T-hangars north of the runway, along with an administration building (FBO), repair shop, and another hangar further down. Operating for their successful charter operations they had the following aircraft: a Cessna 421 (Golden Eagle),
a C-410, multiple C-310's, a Piper Navajo, and multiple Beechcraft Model 18's in passenger or cargo configurations.

Incidents 

 On Friday, April 19, 1963, "Loss was estimated at upward of $100,000 as a storm blew over a hangar and damaged 16 planes at the Youngstown Executive Airport in Austintown Twp. Utility lines and trees littered the entire Youngstown area." 

 Through the 1970s, the airport would close to air traffic on Friday and Saturday nights for drag racing on the runway. Local pilots were not pleased with "their" airport being used for drag racing. Some pilots would take off before the racing started, then fly-by - attempting to land and interrupting the racing. A Beechcraft 18 charter flight even blew over racing equipment with the "prop wash" from the propeller. The racing agency hired a police officer to patrol the airport during the racing due to the conflict of interest.

References 

Defunct airports in Ohio
Youngstown, Ohio